Igor Vladimirovich Zakharkin (born March 16, 1958, Bryansk, RSFSR, USSR) is a  former head coach of Russian national hockey team. Honored coach of Russia. Head of the Department of ice hockey Russian State University of Physical Education, Sport, Youth and Tourism. 

In the early 2000s he was a gymnastics teacher in Säter, Sweden.

June 30, 2009 awarded Order of Honour   for his great contribution to the victory of the national team of Russia on hockey at the world championships in 2008 and 2009.

References

External links
 Игорь Захаркин: «Красной машины» больше никогда не будет

1958 births
Sportspeople from Bryansk
Soviet ice hockey players
Recipients of the Order of Honour (Russia)
Russia men's national ice hockey team coaches
Russian ice hockey coaches
Honoured Coaches of Russia
Living people